The Piece by Piece Tour was the seventh headlining concert tour from American pop recording artist Kelly Clarkson in support of her seventh studio album, Piece by Piece (2015). It began on July 11, 2015, in Hershey, Pennsylvania and concluded on September 10, 2015, in Atlanta. The tour placed 106th for Pollstar's Year End Top 200 North American Toursfall of 2015, grossing $9.7 million.

Background

On February 2, 2015, during an interview with Canadian radio station CHFI, Clarkson was asked about the tour. She replied that she just got the routing for the tour, and they would do the United States, part of Canada, then a full run in Canada, with further dates to follow at a later time.

On March 3, 2015, Clarkson formally announced plans for a tour while promoting Piece by Piece (2015) during an appearance on Good Morning America. An official release confirmed dates across North America. Additional Canadian dates were released on March 16, 2015. Tour dates for the United Kingdom were announced on Clarkson's website on August 3, 2015.
 
Supporting Clarkson in the United States and Toronto were planned opening acts: Eric Hutchinson and Pentatonix. On Clarkson's Facebook page, she showed her excitement about opener Pentatonix. She stated she hoped to convince them to sing with her during her set. Nick Jonas and Tyler Shaw were scheduled to open up for Clarkson in October 2015 in Canada, before dates were ultimately cancelled. On May 21, 2015, it was announced that singer Abi Ann would also be opening up for Clarkson.

Clarkson confirmed plans to include Piece by Piece singles "Heartbeat Song" and "Invincible" in the set list for the show, alongside album-only tracks, "Dance With Me" and "Tightrope", with the latter promised to be a highlight for the show. Speaking to USA Today, Clarkson stated: "Because of an element I've never done on tour, it makes sense to incorporate that song. I'm not flying or on a tightrope – there's not that – but it makes sense with that song and how it sounds on the record that it will fit into the show."

Cancellations
In September 2015, Clarkson tweeted that the last six shows of the U.S. leg of the tour were cancelled. The singer was placed on vocal rest ordered by her doctors. She said, "So bummed that I have to cancel some of my tour dates. This kills me." "I am truly sorry to my fans that have been excited to see this show. Please know that I never cancel anything unless it's absolutely necessary." Two weeks later, the remaining dates of the tour was cancelled. Clarkson commented, "I am truly sorry that I have to cancel the remainder of my tour dates. I was looking forward to sharing this tour with all my amazing fans in Canada and the U.K. Unfortunately my doctor is telling me I have to stay on vocal rest, but I am working hard to get better as fast as possible." Tickets will be refunded.

Show
The show was mixed with her greatest hits, new material off her seventh album Piece by Piece and covers. Clarkson brought back "Fan Requests" which is something she did on the Stronger Tour and 2012 Summer Tour. For "Fan Requests" Clarkson picks a song that was requested via Twitter from someone in the audience each night and her and her band learn the song that day. Starting on July 16, in New York City, Clarkson started doing "KC Classic" in which Clarkson picked a different song each night from her catalog that is not used in the setlist.
 
Also for this tour Clarkson had an "Open Mic Night" where she gave fans the opportunity to perform a "cover" song on stage. Fans submitted a video of themselves through various social media websites and Clarkson then selected one winner for each city.

Some highlights from the show are Clarkson singing "Heartbeat Song" with opening act Pentatonix and "Walk Away" being mashed up with Mark Ronson and Bruno Mars' hit song "Uptown Funk". She opened the show with "Dance With Me", a track off Piece by Piece and closed with her hit "Since U Been Gone".

Commercial reception
General sales for the tour will begin on Saturday, March 14, 2015. Citi has been listed as the official bank for the tour, with a special pre-sale access will be given to Citi's Private Pass Program members on March 10, 2015. Members of Clarkson's fan club, Kellebrities, will also be given special pre-sale availability. The toured placed 106th on Pollstar's "2015 Year End: Top 200 North American Tours", grossing an estimate of $9.7 million.

Critical reception
Jewel Wicker from The Patriot-News says: "There's singing and then there's 'sanging.' Clarkson does the latter." Sarah Rodman of The Boston Globe said: "the Texas native was in peak form, delivering the hits with gusto, raising otherwise overlooked album cuts to memorable heights, and remaking the case for the restorative powers of pop music on a hot summer night." and "Although Clarkson was joking when she remarked that she is improving with age like fine wine, she was right on the money."

Amy Brooks from the Pittsburgh Post-Gazette says that "the Idol winner launched into a stream of catchy hits that begged to be sung along to, had no problem digging up the emotion to put into the songs." Ben Siegel of The Buffalo News describes the concert as "vocally and musically fantastic.

Adam Graham of The Detroit News says, "Kelly Clarkson has an innate reliability that makes her Not Just Another Pop Star." and "Idol" never produced another star as fresh and off-the-cuff as Clarkson. She speaks her mind, doesn't do the canned banter thing, and chits chats with the crowd like they're a couple of old friends hanging out on her back porch. There's no explanation for it other than she's Kelly, she's an original, and she's our original."

Christopher Rosa from VH1, "she sounded fantastic, but that's nothing new. Kelly has one of the most underrated voices in pop, and her pitch-perfect delivery throughout the evening—even during lyric flubs—was pretty awe-inspiring. However, the glittery rock-pop romp revealed other nuggets about Kelly—as a person and artist—that may surprise you."

Reporter The Oakland Press, Gary Graff states: "it may be time for Kelly Clarkson to have her pop diva credentials re-evaluated." Dallas Observers Amy McCarthy says "those vocals are so powerful and affecting — it's hard to miss."

Phoenix New Timess Amanda Ventura reports that "Kelly was downright incredible. Her pipes. Those pipes." According to Michael Escoto of The Arizona Republic, "Kelly Clarkson put on a fantastic show. She really showed her range as an artist who is capable of making you dance and sing along with her more fun, upbeat songs but who can also a few songs later make you reach for the tissues to dry your eyes after an emotional punch to the stomach."

Opening acts
Pentatonix
Eric Hutchinson
Abi Ann

Setlist
{{hidden
| headercss = background: #FFBCD9; font-size: 100%; width: 59%;
| contentcss = text-align: left; font-size: 100%; width: 75%;
| header = I
| content = Tour stops with this setlist: Hershey, Holmdel
"Dance with Me"
"My Life Would Suck Without You"
"Dark Side"
"Mr. Know It All"
"Nostalgic"
Open Mic
Fan Request
"Second Wind"
"Invincible"
 Medley: "Because of You" / "Don't You Wanna Stay" / "Breakaway"
"Tightrope"
"Piece by Piece"
"Take You High" 
"Behind These Hazel Eyes"
"War Paint"
KC Classic
"Stronger (What Doesn't Kill You)"
"Heartbeat Song" 
Mashup: "Walk Away" / "Uptown Funk" 
Encore
 "Bang Bang" 
 "Miss Independent"
 "Since U Been Gone"

}}

{{hidden
| headercss = background: #FFBCD9; font-size: 100%; width: 59%;
| contentcss = text-align: left; font-size: 100%; width: 75%;
| header = II
| content = Tour stops with this set: Mansfield
 "Dance With Me"
 "My Life Would Suck Without You"
 "Catch My Breath"
 "Mr. Know It All
 "Let Your Tears Fall"
 Open Mic
 Fan Request
 "Invincible"
 Medley: "Because of You"/"Don't You Wanna Stay"/"Breakaway"
 "Tightrope"
 "Piece by Piece"
 "Take You High" 
 "Behind These Hazel Eyes"
 "Stronger (What Doesn't Kill You)"
 "Heartbeat Song" 
 Mashup: "Walk Away" / "Uptown Funk" 
Encore
 "Bang, Bang" 
 "Miss Independent"
 "Since U Been Gone"
}}

{{hidden
| headercss = background: #FFBCD9; font-size: 100%; width: 59%;
| contentcss = text-align: left; font-size: 100%; width: 75%;
| header = III
| content = Tour stops with this set: New York City, Burgettstown, Darien, Uncasville, Toronto, Clarkston, Cincinnati, Noblesville, Rosemont, Maryland Heights, Las Vegas, Mountain View, Phoenix, Albuquerque,The Woodlands
 "Dance With Me"
 "My Life Would Suck Without You"
 "Catch My Breath"
 "Nostalgic"
 "Mr. Know It All"
 "Second Wind"
 "Invincible"
 "Piece by Piece
 Medley:"Because of You" / "Breakaway"
 "Tightrope"
 "Take You High 
 "Behind These Hazel Eyes"
 Open Mic
 Fan request
 KC Classic
 "Stronger (What Doesn't Kill You)
 "Heartbeat Song" 
 Mashup: "Walk Away" / "Uptown Funk" 
Encore
 "Bang Bang" 
 "Miss Independent"
 "Since U Been Gone"

}}

Fan Requests

KC Classic

Tour dates

Cancelled shows

Box office score data

Personnel

Band
 Lead vocals: Kelly Clarkson
 Keyboards & musical director: Jason Halbert
 Guitar: Jaco Caraco & Aben Eubanks
 Bass: Einar Pedersen
 Drums: Lester Estelle
 Backup vocalists: Jessi Collins, Nicole Hurst, Bridget Sarai

Other
 Assistant: Ashley Arrison
 Booking: CAA
 Management: Narvel Blackstock & Starstuck Management
 Tour Manager: Dennis Sharp
 Production Manager: Allan Hornall
 Artist Production Manager: Chris Dye
 Production Assistant: Tricia Farrow
 Lighting Director: Fraser Mckeen
 Security: Brian Butner & NPB Companies, Inc.
 FOH Engineer: Chris Michaelessi
 Monitor Engineer: Shaun Sebastian
 Photography: Weiss Eubanks
 Hair & Makeup: Ashley Donovan
 Stylist: Steph Ashmore
 Wardrobe designer: Sylvio Kovacic

References

2015 concert tours
Kelly Clarkson concert tours